The Organisation of European Cancer Institutes (OECI) is an international non-profit organization with European Economic Interest Grouping status. It was created in 1979 to promote greater co-operation among European cancer centres and institutes. The head office of the organisation is located in Brussels at the University Foundation.

Background
The OECI is the main European network of accredited cancer centers on the continent. The OECI relies on a network of almost 100 institutions all over Europe in order to provide cancer patients with specialized healthcare respective to the type of cancer that they have. Similar to the NCI's network of designated (comprehensive) cancer centres, the OECI developed the Accreditation and Designation Program in order to improve organization and teamwork between cancer centres across Europe. In 2017, the OECI program obtained ISQua Accreditation (ISQua is the umbrella organization responsible for the Joint Commission International accreditation).

The OECI plays a role in helping EU Member State authorities to organize their cancer healthcare systems.

In figures 
 Membership across Europe, as well as a few major centres from South America and Southeast Asia
 121 members
 Membership categories: members undergoing accreditation and designation (A&D; 60); accredited and designated cancer centre; and accredited and designated comprehensive cancer centre; other members
 4 working groups: accreditation and designation programme, biobanks and molecular pathobiology, supportive and palliative care, cancer economics and benchmarking, collaboration for good practices with patients, cancer outcomes research
 10 scientific papers/articles

OECI-designated Comprehensive cancer centers
Source:
Belgium (1): 
Institut Jules Bordet (IJB) (Brussels)
Finland (1):
 Department of Oncology / Comprehensive Cancer Centre at Helsinki University Central Hospital (HUCH) (Helsinki)
France (6):
 Centre Francois Baclesse (Caen)
  (Lyon)
 Institut Curie, Curie Institute (Paris)
Institut Gustave Roussy (Paris)
 Institut Paoli-Calmettes, (Marseille)
 Institut Universitaire du Cancer Toulouse Oncopole (Toulouse)
Hungary (1):
Országos Onkológiai Intézet or National Institute of Oncology (Budapest)
Italy (9):
Centro di Riferimento Oncologico at Istituto Nazionale Tumori (Aviano)
European Institute of Oncology (Milan)
 Istituto Nazionale Tumori -IRCCS  "Fondazione G.Pascale"  (INT-Pascale) (Napoli)
Regina Elena National Cancer Institute (IRE) (Rome)
Azienda Unità Sanitaria Locale di Reggio Emilia - IRCCS (Reggio Emilia)
 IRCCS Azienda Ospedaliera Universitaria San Martino - IST- Istituto Nazionale per la Ricerca sul Cancro (Genova)
 Fondazione IRCCS- Istituto Nazionale dei Tumori di Milano (Milano)
 Istituto Oncologico Veneto IRCCS-IOV (Padova)
 IRCCS Istituto Clinico Humanitas (Milano)
Norway (1):
 Oslo University Hospital (Oslo)
Portugal (1): 
Instituto Português de Oncologia Francisco Gentil, IPO-Porto (Porto)
Netherlands (3): 
 Maastricht University Medical Centre, (Maastricht)
 Netherlands Cancer Institute (Amsterdam)
 Universitair Medisch Centrum Groningen (UMCG), (Groningen)
Sweden (3):
Karolinska Institute and University Hospital, (Stockholm)
Skåne University Hospital Comprehensive Cancer Centre, (Lund)
Sahlgrenska Comprehensive Cancer Centre, Gothenburg)
United Kingdom (3):
 The Christie NHS Foundation Trust (Manchester)
 Cambridge Cancer Centre (see also Department of Oncology, University of Cambridge) (Cambridge)
 King's Health Partners Integrated Cancer Centre, King's College London (London)

OECI-designated cancer centers 
Belgium (1): 
 Kortrijk Cancer Centre at AZ Groeninge (Kortrijk)
Czech Republic (1): 
Masarykův onkologický ústav at Masaryk Memorial Cancer Institute (BRNO)
Denmark (1): 
Velje Cancer Centre at Lillebaelt Hospital (Velje)
Estonia (1): 
Sihtasutus Tartu Ülikooli Kliinikum, Tartu University Hospital (Tartu)
Finland (3):
 Turku University Hospital Cancer Centre, (Turku)
 Tampere University Hospital, (Tampere)
 Kuopio University Hospital, Kuopio
Ireland (2): 
 Beaumont RCSI Cancer Centre, Beaumont Hospital (Dublin)
 Trinity St James's Cancer Institute, St. James's Hospital (Dublin) 
Italy (3):
 Istituto Tumori Giovanni Paolo II, Istituto di Ricovero e Cura a Carattere Scientifico (Bari)
 IRCCS, Centro di Riferimento Oncologico della Basilicata (CROB) (Rionero in Vulture)
 Azienda Unità Sanitaria Locale di Reggio Emilia - IRCCS Istituto in Tecnologie Avanzate e Modelli Assistenziali in Oncologia (Reggio Emilia)
Lithuania (1): 
 National Cancer Institute (Vilnius)
Portugal (2):
 Instituto Português de Oncologia Francisco Gentil, E.P.E. (IPO-Lisbon) (Lisbon)
 Instituto Português de Oncologia Francisco Gentil, IPO-Coimbra (Coimbra)
Romania (1): 
The “Prof. Dr. Ion Chiricuta” Institute of Oncology (IOCN) (Cluj Cluj-Napoca)
Slovenia (1)
Institute of Oncology Ljubljana (Ljubljana)
Spain (1):
 Fundación Instituto Valenciano de Oncología or Valencia Oncology Institute Foundation (IVO) (Valencia)
Turkey (1):
Anadolu Sağlık Merkezi or Anadolu Medical Center (Kocaeli)

OECI members, currently in the accreditation process 
Finland (2): 
 Cancer Center of Kuopio University Hospital, (Kuopio)
 Oulu University Hospital or Oulun Yliopistollinen Sairaala (Oulu)
France (1):
 APHP-CARPEM Institute, Paris
 Institut de Cancérologie de l'Ouest (ICO), Saint Herblain Cedex
 Association Toulousaine d’Oncologie Publique (ATOP), Toulouse cedex 9
Ireland (1): 
 Beaumont Hospital, Dublin
Spain (1): 
 Vall d’Hebron Barcelona Campus Hospitalari, Vall d'Hebron University Hospital, Barcelona
Sweden (2):
 Skånes Universitetssjukhus, Lund
 Sahlgrenska University Hospital, Göteborg
Netherlands (1): 
 University Medical Center Groningen, Comprehensive Cancer Center (UMCG-CCC), Groningen
Slovenia (1):
 Onkološki Inštitut Ljubljana, Ljubljana

OECI members, not (yet) participating in the accreditation process 
Austria (3): 
 Comprehensive Cancer Center Graz, Graz
 Comprehensive Cancer Center Vienna, Vienna
 Zentrum für Tumorerkrankungen, Linz, Onkologisches Leitspital für Oberösterreich, The Sisters of Charity Clinical Cancer Center, Linz (SCCCC)(Linz)
Belgium (2): 
 Institut Roi Albert II /King Albert II Cancer Institute, Cliniques universitaires Saint-Luc, (Brussels)
 Leuven Kanker Instituut (LKI) /UZ Leuven, KU Leuven, (Leuven)
Croatia (1): Klinika za tumore Klinicki bolnicki centar Sestre milosrdnice at University Hospital for Tumors, Sisters of Charity Hospital (Zagreb)
Czech Republic (1): 
 Institute of Biostatistics and Analyses, Faculty of Medicine and Faculty of Science, Masaryk University, BRNO
Denmark (1): 
 Danish Cancer Society Research Center, Copenhagen
Estonia (1): 
 North Estonia Medical Centre, (Tallinn)
France (3): 
 Centre de Lutte Contre le Cancer Paul Strauss, (Strasbourg)
 Comprehensive Cancer Center Jean Perrin, Clermond-Ferrand
 Centre Henri Becquerel, (Rouen)
Germany (3): 
 Deutsches Krebsforschungszentrum (DKFZ), German Cancer Research Center, (Heidelberg)
 Universitäts KrebsCentrum Dresden, University Cancer Center Dresden, (Dresden)
 Charité Comprehensive Cancer Center, (Berlin)
Hungary (1): 
 Országos Korányi TBC és Pulmonológiai Intézet, National Korányi Institute of Tb and Pulmonology, (Budapest)
Italy (8): 
 Ospedale San Raffaele (OSR), (Milano)
 European School of Oncology (ESO), (Milano)
 Fondazione IFOM, - FIRC Institute of Molecular Oncology, (Milano)
 Istituto Scientifico Romagnolo per lo Studio e la Cura dei Tumori [IRST]-IRCCS, (eldola- Forlì)
 Candiolo Cancer Institute  FPO-IRCCS, (Candiolo-Torino)
 IRCCS - Istituto di Ricerche Farmacologiche Mario Negri, (Milano)
 Ente Ospedaliero Ospedali Galliera, (Genova)
 Istituto Dermatologico S. Gallicano, S.Gallicano Dermatological Institute, (Roma)
Poland (1): 
 Wielkopolskie Centrum Onkologii, Greater Poland Cancer Center, Poznan
Romania (1): 
 SC RTC Radiology Therapeutic Center Amethyst Radiotherapy, Otopeni Ilfov County
Russia (3): 
 Tatarstan Cancer Center “TCC”, (Kazan)
 N.N.Blokhin Russian Cancer Research Centre, (Moscow)
 National Medical Research Radiological Centre (NMRRC), (Moscow)
Serbia (1): 
 Oncology Institute of Vojvodina, (Sremska Kamenica)
Slovakia (1): 
 Ústav experimentálnej onkológie SAV, (Bratislava)
Slovenia (1)
 Institute of Oncology Ljubljana, (Lubljana)
Spain(1)
Catalan Institute of Oncology, (Barcelona)
Sweden (2): 
 Uppsala University Hospital, (Uppsala)
 Skane University Hospital, South Sweden Cancer Centre, (Lund)
Netherlands (3): 
 Erasmus MC Cancer Institute, (Rotterdam)
 Netherlands Comprehensive Cancer Organisation, (Utrecht)
 Radboudumc Centre for Oncology, (Nijmegen)
 Rijnstate, (Arnhem)
Turkey (1): 
 Dokuz Eylül University, Instıtute of Oncology, (Izmir)
Ukraine (1): 
 RE Kavetsky Institute of Experimental Pathology, Oncology and Radiobiology of National Academy of Sciences of Ukraine, (IEPOR) (Kyiv)
United Kingdom (1): 
 Imperial College Healthcare NHS Trust, London

References

External links 
 

https://www.eacr.org/strategic-partners/oeci
https://wwicsgroup.com

Cancer organisations based in Belgium
European medical and health organizations
Medical and health organisations based in Belgium